The Malayan Declaration of Independence (Malay: Pemasyhuran Kemerdekaan Tanah Melayu Jawi: ڤمشهوران کمرديکان تانه ملايو), was officially proclaimed on Saturday, 31 August 1957, by Tunku Abdul Rahman, the first chief minister of the Federation of Malaya. In a ceremony held at the Merdeka Stadium, the proclamation document was read out at exactly 09:30 a.m. in the presence of thousands of Malayan citizens, Malay Rulers and foreign dignitaries. The proclamation acknowledges the establishment of an independent and democratic Federation of Malaya, which came into effect on the termination of the British protectorate over nine Malay states and the end of British colonial rule in two Straits Settlements, Malacca and Penang.

The document of the declaration was signed by Tunku Abdul Rahman, who was appointed as the nation's first prime minister. The event is celebrated annually in Malaysia with national day Hari Merdeka.

Date of Independence
The date for Federation of Malaya's Independence on 31 August 1957 was determined after Tunku Abdul Rahman, Haji Sulaiman Palestine, Haji Ahmad Badawi, and a number of other UMNO leaders sought the views of Syeikh Abdullah Fahim, a notable Ulama from Kepala Batas, Penang. According to Syeikh Abdullah Fahim, if the British would not grant independence to Malaya on 31 August 1957, the next fitting date should be 31 August 1962. The Saturday 31 August 1957 was referred by Syeikh Abdullah Fahim as am khair atana (عام خير اتانا) in Arabic which means 'Good Year Has Come to Us'. It was confirmed in a February 1956 Alliance rally in Malacca after the Tunku had just arrived from the United Kingdom.

Declaration ceremony
On the night of 30 August 1957, crowds gathered at the Royal Selangor Club Padang in Kuala Lumpur to witness the handover of power from the British. Prime Minister-designate Tunku Abdul Rahman arrived at 11:58 p.m. and joined members of the Alliance Party's youth divisions in observing two minutes of darkness. On the stroke of midnight, the lights were switched back on, and the Union Flag in the square was lowered as the royal anthem God Save The Queen. The new Flag of Malaya was raised as the national anthem Negaraku was played. This was followed by seven chants of "Merdeka" by the crowd. Tunku Abdul Rahman later gave a speech hailing the ceremony as "greatest moment in the life of the Malayan people". Before giving the address to the crowd, he was given a necklace by representatives of the Alliance Party youth in honour of this great occasion in history, with a map of Malaya inscribed on it. The event ended at one in the morning the next day.

On the morning of 31 August 1957, the festivities moved to the newly completed Merdeka Stadium. More than 20,000 people witnessed the ceremony, which began at 9:30 a.m. Those in attendance included rulers of the Malay states, foreign dignitaries, members of the federal cabinet, and citizens. The Queen's representative, the Duke of Gloucester presented Tunku Abdul Rahman with the instrument of independence. Tunku then proceeded to read the declaration, which culminated in the chanting of "Merdeka!" seven times with the crowd joining in. The ceremony continued with the raising of the National Flag of Malaya accompanied by the national anthem being played by a military band and a 21-gun salute, followed by an azan call and a thanksgiving prayer in honour of this great occasion.

The day followed with the solemn installation of the first Yang di-Pertuan Agong, Tuanku Abdul Rahman of Negeri Sembilan, at Jalan Ampang, and the first installation banquet in his honour in the evening followed by a beating retreat performance and a fireworks display. Sports events and other events marked the birth of the new nation.

The document
The document of the declaration was written in both Malay in Jawi script and English.

See also
Federation of Malaya Independence Act 1957
Hari Merdeka (Independence Day)
United Nations Security Council Resolution 125

References

Declarations of independence
August 1957 events in Asia
1957 in Malaya